Warrong is a town in the Shire of Minhamite, in  South Western Victoria.

The town is in the County of Villiers and the Post Code is 3283. The local economy is largely agriculture, primarily based on sheep and cattle, and the nearest large town is Warrnambool 30 km to the south.

References

Towns in Victoria (Australia)